Sukhwinder Singh is a playback singer.

Sukhwinder Singh may also refer to:

 Sukhwinder Singh (footballer, born 1979), Indian football goalkeeper
 Sukhwinder Singh (footballer, born 1983), Indian football midfielder
 Sukhwinder Singh (football manager) (born 1949), Indian footballer and manager
 Sukhwinder Singh (field hockey)
 Sukhvinder Singh (cricketer) (born 1967), Indian cricketer
 Sukhwinder Singh Bhatti (born 1950s), human rights activist